Norman Robson is the name of:

Norman Robson (botanist), English botanist
Norman Robson (footballer), English footballer